The Canadian indie rock band Arcade Fire has released six studio albums, three extended plays and twenty-four singles.

Albums

Studio albums

Soundtrack albums

Extended plays

Singles

Promotional singles

Split singles

Other charted and certified songs

Other appearances

Music videos

Notes

References

External links
 Official website
 Arcade Fire at AllMusic
 
 Arcade Fire discography at MusicTea

Discographies of Canadian artists
Rock music group discographies
Discography